RMS Celtic was an ocean liner owned by the White Star Line. She was the last ship ordered by Thomas Henry Ismay before his death in 1899. The second liner of her name (the first was completed in 1872) she was put into service in 1901. Her large size (she could carry nearly 3,000 passengers) and her low but economical speed (while her contemporary liners then sailed on average at ) inaugurated a new company policy aiming to favour size, luxury and comfort, to the detriment of speed.

Assigned to the route between Liverpool and New York, Celtic experimented with a mode of slower than usual rotations, but was also used for a long cruise in 1902 which met with some success. In 1907, she was briefly used for the American Line on the Southampton route, before White Star set up its own fast service on this route. From Liverpool, the Big Four-class ships provide a slow but more economical service, both for the company and for the passengers. When World War I broke out, Celtic was first converted to an auxiliary cruiser. The Admiralty quickly concluded, however, that such a ship was not ideal for these functions, and transformed her into a troop transport. Although she struck a mine in February 1917 and was torpedoed in March 1918, she was repaired both times and continued her career.

From 1920, and after having undergone a refit reducing her passenger capacity, she resumed her transatlantic service, which was only disturbed by a few collisions. However, this commercial career ceased on 10 December 1928, when, in stormy seas as she approached Cobh, Celtic hit rocks and ran aground. All the passengers were rescued, but the company considered it futile to attempt to salvage the liner so Celtic was scrapped on the spot. The shipbreaking operation lasted until 1933.

History

Conception and construction

Celtics conception, as the other Big Four-class ships, came about in 1898 following a noticing of an opportunity to introduce a series of liners which would prioritise more on comfort rather than speed. Cymric had initially been designed as a combination passenger and livestock carrier and was designed with smaller engines capable of running the ship at more modest economical speeds. When this combination proved unpopular to travellers, Cymric was reconfigured as a full passenger vessel. The result of this was that although she was considerably smaller than the new Oceanic, her smaller engines and fewer boilers installation allowed more space for passenger accommodations. In September 1898 contracts were made for Celtic, and the keel was laid at Harland and Wolff on 22 March 1899.

Celtic was the last liner ordered during Thomas Henry Ismay's lifetime. On the death of Ismay, all the efforts of the Harland & Wolff yards in Belfast were turned towards Celtic. The liner met all new objectives: with it, the company definitively abandoned the race for speed and never again sought to win the Blue Riband, favouring comfort and economy. If this change was really inaugurated by Celtic, it was already tested on a smaller scale a few years ago on Cymric. The success of the formula was enough for White Star to draw its new guideline for the next three decades, up until its demise.

Celtic was designed to operate an average speed of 16 knots, which was what White Star ships already reached almost thirty years earlier, the liner, with its 20,904 gross tonnage, was the first to exceed s tonnage.

Early career

Celtic made her maiden voyage on 26 July 1901 between Liverpool and New York. Her size was such that her loading time in each port was one week, in order to allow the embarkation of coal, goods, and passengers. This combined with her average speed of 16 knots confirmed the exit from the race for speed in which the Cunard Line and Norddeutscher Lloyd were still in. In February 1902, the liner was sent to the Mediterranean Sea for a five-week cruise, with 800 passengers on board, which allowed the White Star Line to experiment with this means to make its ships profitable during the off-season. While two new ships joined her in 1903 and 1904 (Cedric and ), Celtics career was only disturbed by a few incidents at that time. A collision occurred on River Mersey with the steamer Heathmore on 15 April 1903. The liner came out of the incident with a hole in her hull, which was quickly repaired. A few months later, she was also affected by a minor fire which destroyed a cargo of cotton in her hold. On 25 December 1905, she encountered a rogue wave that hit the ship and caused damage to the second class facilities, in particular, glass panels in the smoking room, taking with it a door, and frightening the passengers.

Despite these incidents, Celtic was a resounding success. In September 1904, she set a record by carrying, from Liverpool to New York, 2,957 passengers (more than her normal capacity), which was the absolute record of passengers carried by a liner of the White Star Line throughout the history of the company.

In April and May 1907, while the White Star Line had been part of the International Mercantile Marine Co. for several years, Celtic was used for two crossings by another company within the trust, the American Line, which used it to replace  on the Southampton to New York route. During this period, however, the liner kept the colours of its original company.

World War I
At the start of World War I, Celtic was one of four White Star Line ships that were converted to auxiliary cruisers, along with Cedric, Oceanic and Teutonic. Intended for patrol missions in the North Sea, she was armed with cannons and joined the 10th Cruiser Squadron. Celtic was commissioned on 20 October 1914. She carried out her first patrol mission on 4 December 1914, under the command of a captain of the Royal Navy assisted by its former civilian commander, Captain Hambleton. However, the British Admiralty quickly became aware of the uselessness of such ships, too large to ideally fulfill the missions entrusted to them. On January 1916, Celtic was therefore withdrawn from service.

However, she did not remain inactive; immediately after the end of her service as a cruiser, she was transformed into a troop transport, a mission favored by her large size which enabled her to embark a large number of soldiers and good quantities of equipment. Her first crossings, at the beginning of 1916, took her between Liverpool and Egypt. On 15 February 1917, Celtic struck a mine off the Isle of Man. Seventeen people on board were killed, but the ship survived. A number of passengers were rescued by the London and North Western Railway ship . Celtic was towed to Peel Bay and repaired in Belfast.

It was during these repairs that the ship was requisitioned as part of the Liner Requisition Scheme on 17 April 1917. She was assigned to missions to transport equipment from the United States. Her main task was to carry oil in her cargo hold, with her capable of carrying 700 tonnes per trip to Liverpool, where it is recovered to supply Navy ships. On 31 March 1918, U-Boat  torpedoed Celtic in the Irish Sea. Six people on board were killed, but again, Celtic remained afloat. Eventually, the damaged vessel was towed to Liverpool and repaired again. On 17 May 1919, the British government finally returned her to her owner, who sent her to Harland & Wolff shipyards to refit her for her return to the New York route.

Post-war and final demise

In 1920, after work to restore her original decor was finished, Celtic resumed the Liverpool-New York route. To adapt her to new types of clientele and to the drop in the number of immigrants to the North Atlantic, her capacity has been greatly reduced to 350 first class, 250 second class, and 1000 third class passengers. She subsequently experienced several incidents. The first incident occurred in on 25 April 1925 while in the Mersey, when she accidentally rammed the Coast Line’s ship Hampshire Coast. Both vessels suffered only minor damage. The same year Celtic lost a propeller in Boston Harbor and had to return to the dock, forcing her passengers to leave by train for New York in order to take another ship.

The second collision took place on 29 January 1927, when Celtic was rammed in thick fog by the American Diamond Lines Anaconda off Fire Island. That same year, as newer ships entered service on the North Atlantic, the White Star Line refitted Celtic to carry 2,500 passengers, while her first class was converted to cabin class at cheaper rates, to keep up with account of her low speed.

Her career ended prematurely in December 1928. On December 1, the liner left New York for Cobh, via Boston, with 300 passengers on board, 350 members of the crew, and a large cargo. The voyage proceeded without incident and in good weather under the command of captain Gilbert Berry, until the night of the 9th to the 10th. As she approached Cobh, the weather became rough and it became impossible to embark the coastal pilot. Berry therefore decided to cancel the stopover and leave directly for Liverpool. Some time later, the weather seemed to improve, and the captain changed his mind and returned to Cobh to try to disembark the passengers and bags of mail that were to stop there. This required stopping the ship offshore while waiting for the pilot to return. When his barge approached the ship, the weather became agitated again, and it was impossible to board. At 4:55 am, a stronger wave accompanied by a strong gust of wind precipitated Celtic on the rocks of Roche's Point early on 10 December 1928, and she became stranded on the Cow and Calf rocks. The Ballycotton Lifeboat T.P.Hearne 2, along with tugs, a destroyer and local life-saving teams, arrived. Tenders from Cobh disembarked the passengers. Seven thousand tons of cargo were scattered. A salvage team from Cox and Danks was provided to attempt recovery, but several men died after a hold loaded with grain and flooded with seawater was found to have filled with toxic fumes; due to structural failures it was judged the ship could not be moved or salvaged, and was abandoned to the insurance company who declared the ship to be a total loss. Celtic was completely dismantled for scrap by 1933.

Characteristics
With 21,035 gross tonnage, she was the largest liner in service at the time, although she was quickly overtaken by her larger sister ships. she measured 701 feet (213.8 m) long by 75 feet (22.9 m) wide, which made her slightly shorter than Oceanic, which retained its record until 1904. Powered by triple expansion machines and propelled by two propellers, Celtic sailed on average at 16 knots. The ship's silhouette was similar to that of Oceanic, with a black hull, white superstructure and two ocher-brown and black funnels. The ship was also provided with four masts which were not intended to receive sails (but served as support for the cables of the wireless telegraphy and the lookout's nest)

Although slightly smaller, Celtic offered a luxury equivalent to her sister ships (although Adriatic benefited from new facilities such as her swimming pool). The ship had spacious cabins, supplied with electricity, as well as a majestic dining room topped by a glass roof, and a smoking room with stained glass windows. Passengers also had access to a library, promenade deck, lounge and veranda cafe.

The liner was originally distinguished by her very large capacity, being able to carry 347 first-class passengers, 160 second-class and 2350 third-class. On one occasion, in 1904, she carried on board 2,957 passengers, the largest number of people embarked in peacetime on a ship of the White Star Line at the time. In 1920, however, her capacity was significantly reduced, offering places for 350 first-class, 250 second-class and, 1000 third-class passengers. Finally, from 1927, she was converted into a cabin class ship, at more advantageous rates, and could carry 2,500 passengers.

References

Notes

Bibliography
 
 
 
 
 
  (Official publication for the Common Council for Trade by the Registrar General of Shipping and Seamen)

External links

 Great ships: Celtic
 The great ocean liners: Celtic 
 Cabin Liners: Celtic / Cedric Interior Tour 

 

Ships built in Belfast
Ships of the White Star Line
World War I Auxiliary cruisers of the Royal Navy
1901 ships
Shipwrecks in the Atlantic Ocean
Maritime incidents in 1917
Maritime incidents in 1918
Maritime incidents in 1925
Maritime incidents in 1927
Maritime incidents in 1928
Ships built by Harland and Wolff